The 1st Ohio Infantry Regiment was an infantry regiment in the Union Army during the American Civil War. It served in the Western Theater in a number of campaigns and battles.

Three-months regiment
With the outbreak of the Civil War in the spring of 1861, President Abraham Lincoln called for 75,000 volunteers from nearly every state. In April, recruiters quickly filled the quota for a number of regiments in the state of Ohio, with several regiments enlisting for 3-months, including a command designated as the 1st Ohio. Mustering in April 17, 1861, under Colonel Alexander M. McCook, the 1st Ohio Infantry Regiment travelled by train to Washington, D.C. for garrison duty in the capital's fortifications and defenses until July. The regiment was placed in Schenck's Brigade, Tyler's Division, Irvin McDowell's Army of Northeastern Virginia. It first saw action at Vienna, Virginia, on June 17 and again on July 9 before occupying Fairfax Court House.  It fought at the First Battle of Bull Run and helped cover the army's bitter retreat to Washington. The regiment soon returned to Ohio and mustered out August 2.
The regiment was divided into ten separate companies A-K. Each company was stationed out of a different village A-Lancaster B Lafayette C Dayton D Montogomery E Cleveland F Hiberian G Portsmouth H Zanesville I Mansfield K Jaskson.

Three-years regiment
After the term of service was over in August, a number of the men re-enlisted for 3-years in the reconstituted 1st Ohio Infantry Regiment, under the command of Col. Benjamin F. Smith. The regiment was organized at Camp Corwin in Dayton between August 5 and October 30, receiving muskets, uniforms, and accoutrements. On the last day of August, the regiment entrained for Cincinnati for additional training and guard duty. The regiment left Ohio in November 1861 for Louisville, Kentucky. From there, they were posted in a number of Kentucky towns through February 1862, striving to keep the border state in the Union.

In late winter 1862 the regiment was attached to the 4th Brigade, 2nd Division, Army of the Ohio, serving in Tennessee under Don Carlos Buell at Shiloh. There, on April 7, the regiment became engaged at about 10 a.m., losing 2 men killed, 2 officers and 45 men wounded, and 1 man missing. Following Shiloh, the regiment served in Mississippi during the Siege of Corinth before moving to Tuscumbi, Florence, and Huntsville Alabama, June 10 - July 5. In August, the regiment returned to Kentucky (Louisville) as the army pursued Confederates under Braxton Bragg, fighting at the Battle of Perryville. The well-travelled regiment then marched to Nashville, Tennessee, in October and November. With the restructuring of the western army in November and the replacement of General Buell with William Rosecrans, the 1st OVI was assigned to the 3rd Brigade, 2nd Division, Right Wing XIV Army Corps, Army of the Cumberland. It stayed in Nashville until December 26, when the regiment departed for a short campaign that culminated in the Battle of Stones River.

For much of 1863, the 1st Ohio Infantry was stationed in Tennessee and assigned to the 3rd Brigade, 2nd Division, XX Corps, Army of the Cumberland, until October when the IV Corps was formed from the remnants of the heavily depleted XX Corps and XXI Corps. Under the command of Maj. Joab A. Stafford, the regiment saw action at the Battle of Chickamauga, a stinging defeat for Rosecrans' army. It marched to Knoxville as part of the army relieving the Confederate siege of Union forces at that city. Yet another reorganization of the army resulted in the 1st Ohio Infantry being assigned to the 2nd Brigade, 3rd Division, 4th Army Corps, Army of the Cumberland, until September 1864. It fought under Grant at Missionary Ridge, where it was the first regiment to plant its colors on the hilltop, and with Sherman in the Atlanta campaign. The regiment spent much of the rest of the fall on scouting duty in Tennessee.

The 1st Ohio Volunteer Infantry mustered out of the Union army from September 24 to October 14, 1864, when the 3-year term of enlistment expired. A number of recruits re-enlisted and transferred to the 18th Ohio Volunteer Infantry on October 31, 1864, and remained on duty through the end of the Civil War.

The regiment lost during its service 5 officers and 116 enlisted men killed and mortally wounded in combat and 130 enlisted men by disease (a total of 251 fatalities). It was engaged in 24 battles and skirmishes, lost 527 men in action, and marched 2,500 miles. Following the war, the veterans erected a monument on the Shiloh National Military Park. The regiment is also commemorated on the Soldiers' and Sailors' Monument in Public Square in downtown Cleveland. The tattered battle flags of both the three-months and three-years regiments (as well as the guidon of Company B, the Lafayette Guards) are preserved in the museum of the Ohio Historical Society in Columbus.

Another "1st Ohio Volunteer Infantry" (unrelated to the Civil War regiment) existed in the Mexican–American War. Still another regiment of the same name was organized April 26, 1898, for duty in the Spanish–American War.

See also
List of Ohio Civil War units
Ohio in the Civil War

Notes

References

Further reading
 Kern, Albert, ed., History of the First Regiment Ohio Volunteer Infantry in the Civil War 1861-1865. Dayton, Ohio: 1918.

External links
 Larry Stevens' 1st OVI Page
 The Ohio in the Civil War Network Archive
 1st OVI monument on the Shiloh battlefield
  Battleflags of the 1st OVI at the Ohio Historical Society
 National Park Service: Civil War Soldiers and Sailors System
Civil War Index: 1st Ohio Infantry - 3 Months Service in the American Civil War
Civil War Index: 1st Ohio Infantry - 3 Years Service in the American Civil War

Units and formations of the Union Army from Ohio
1861 establishments in Ohio
Military units and formations established in 1861
Military units and formations disestablished in 1864
1864 disestablishments in Ohio